was a Japanese anime director affiliated with Pierrot. He was best known as the director of critically acclaimed anime series The Twelve Kingdoms.

Filmography 
As director (incomplete list):
Glass Mask (1998-1999)
Super GALS! Kotobuki Ran (2001-2002)
The Twelve Kingdoms (2002-2003)
Midori Days (2004)
Victorian Romance Emma (2005-2007)
Kurokami  (2009)
The Last: Naruto the Movie (2014)

References

External links
 
 https://www.imdb.com/name/nm0462076/ (all pre-1996 films listed in this page at IMDB is a mistake)

1965 births
2015 deaths
Anime directors
People from Kanagawa Prefecture